Elizabeth Marion Llewellyn-Smith  (born 17 August 1934) is a British academic administrator, who was the principal of St Hilda's College, Oxford.

Early life and education
Llewellyn-Smith was born in Upshire, Essex in 1934 and educated at Christ's Hospital, Girton College, Cambridge and the Royal College of Defence Studies.

Career
She was a senior civil servant, Deputy Director General of Fair Trading (1982-7), Deputy Secretary at the Department for Trade and Industry Companies Division (1987–90), director of the European Investment Bank (1987–90) and then the eighth principal of St Hilda's College from 1990 to 2001, when she retired. During her time as Principal, her portrait was commissioned, painted in 1996 by Tom Phillips, which now hangs at the college. 

In 1995 she headed a working party of the  Institute of Chartered Accountants in England and Wales  to investigate whether large audit clients were damaged by competitive pricing, concluding they were not. 
She was also a lay board member of the Investigation and Discipline Board (IDB) of the Accountancy Foundation in 2002.

In 1993, Llewellyn Smith wrote of her doubts that Oxford University would consider institutional change as a way of allowing women's colleges to continue to accept only women students. 
In 1996, she authored a chapter as part of a collection of women writing about their journeys to leadership in higher education.

Honours
She was appointed a Companion of the Order of the Bath (CB) in the 1985 Birthday Honours.

As of 2011, she was Honorary Fellow of Girton College, Cambridge.

References

1934 births
Living people
People educated at Christ's Hospital
Alumni of Girton College, Cambridge
Companions of the Order of the Bath
Principals of St Hilda's College, Oxford